A web browser is an application for accessing websites. When a user requests a web page from a particular website, the browser retrieves its files from a web server and then displays the page on the user's screen. Browsers are used on a range of devices, including desktops, laptops, tablets, and smartphones. In 2020, an estimated 4.9 billion people have used a browser. The most used browser is Google Chrome, with a 65% global market share on all devices, followed by Safari with 18%.

A web browser is not the same thing as a search engine, though the two are often confused. A search engine is a website that provides links to other websites. However, to connect to a website's server and display its web pages, a user must have a web browser installed. In some technical contexts, browsers are referred to as "user agents."

Function

The purpose of a web browser is to fetch content from the World Wide Web or from local storage and display it on a user's device. This process begins when the user inputs a Uniform Resource Locator (URL), such as https://en.wikipedia.org/, into the browser. Virtually all URLs are retrieved using the Hypertext Transfer Protocol (HTTP), a set of rules for the transfer of data. If the URL uses the secure mode of HTTP (HTTPS), the connection between the browser and the web server is encrypted for the purposes of communications security and information privacy.

Web pages usually contain hyperlinks to other pages and resources. Each link contains a URL, and when it is clicked or tapped, the browser navigates to the new resource. Most browsers use an internal cache of web page resources to improve loading times for subsequent visits to the same page. The cache can store many items, such as large images, so they do not need to be downloaded from the server again. Cached items are usually only stored for as long as the web server stipulates in its HTTP response messages.

Privacy
During the course of browsing, cookies received from various websites are stored by the browser. Some of them contain login credentials or site preferences. However, others are used for tracking user behavior over long periods of time, so browsers typically provide a section in the menu for deleting cookies. Finer-grained management of cookies usually requires a browser extension.

History

The first web browser, called WorldWideWeb, was created in 1990 by Sir Tim Berners-Lee. He then recruited Nicola Pellow to write the Line Mode Browser, which displayed web pages on dumb terminals. The Mosaic web browser was released in April 1993, and was later credited as the first web browser to find mainstream popularity. Its innovative graphical user interface made the World Wide Web easy to navigate and thus more accessible to the average person. This, in turn, sparked the Internet boom of the 1990s, when the Web grew at a very rapid rate. Marc Andreessen, the leader of the Mosaic team, started his own company, Netscape, which released the Mosaic-influenced Netscape Navigator in 1994. Navigator quickly became the most popular browser.

Microsoft debuted Internet Explorer in 1995, leading to a browser war with Netscape. Within a few years, Microsoft gained a dominant position in the browser market for two reasons: it bundled Internet Explorer with Microsoft Windows, their popular operating system and did so as freeware with no restrictions on usage. The market share of Internet Explorer peaked at over 95% in the early 2000s. In 1998, Netscape launched what would become the Mozilla Foundation to create a new browser using the open-source software model. This work evolved into the Firefox browser, first released by Mozilla in 2004. Firefox's market share peaked at 32% in 2010. Apple released its Safari browser in 2003. Safari remains the dominant browser on Apple devices, though it did not become popular elsewhere.

Google debuted its Chrome browser in 2008, which steadily took market share from Internet Explorer and became the most popular browser in 2012. Chrome has remained dominant ever since. By 2015, Microsoft replaced Internet Explorer with Edge for the Windows 10 release. Since the early 2000s, browsers have greatly expanded their HTML, CSS, JavaScript, and multimedia capabilities. One reason has been to enable more sophisticated websites, such as web apps. Another factor is the significant increase of broadband connectivity, which enables people to access data-intensive content, such as video streaming, that was not possible during the era of dial-up modems.

Browsers 

The current most used browser worldwide is Google Chrome, with a 65% global market share on all devices. Google Chrome is built on Google's free and open-source software project Chromium, and is a major component of Google's operating system ChromeOS. Apple's Safari has the second highest global market share, at 18%, while Microsoft Edge has the second highest desktop share. Safari is based on WebKit and is the default web browser for Mac computers. Introduced in 2015, Microsoft Edge is the default web browser on Windows 10 and 11 computers. Mozilla Foundation's Firefox is the fourth most popular desktop browser, and unlike some more popular browsers, is free and open-source.

Some alternative browsers have gained prevalence, due to their increased customization and privacy. Some such browsers also have built-in adblockers. Examples include Brave, Epic, Maxthon, and Opera. The Tor Browser gives access to the Tor anonymity network. Tor allows access to the dark web, repeatedly encrypting traffic for privacy. The alternative browsers have low market share compared to the large browsers; for example, Opera is the highest alternative browser by a wide margin, at a 2.49% market share in October 2022.

Features
The most popular browsers share many features in common. They automatically log users' browsing history, unless the users turn off their browsing history or use the non-logging private mode. They also allow users to set bookmarks, customize the browser with extensions, and can manage user passwords. Some provide a sync service and web accessibility features.

Most browsers have common user interface features such as:
 Allowing the user to having multiple pages open at the same time, either in different browser windows or in different tabs of the same window.
 Back and forward buttons to go back to the previous page visited or forward to the next one.
 A refresh or reload and a stop button to reload and cancel loading the current page. (In most browsers, the stop button is merged with the reload button.)
 A home button to return to the user's home page.
 An address bar to input the URL of a page and display it, and a search bar to input terms into a search engine. (In most browsers, the search bar is merged with the address bar.)

While mobile browsers have similar UI features as desktop versions, the limitations of touch screens require mobile UIs to be simpler. The difference is significant for users accustomed to keyboard shortcuts. The most popular desktop browsers also have sophisticated web development tools, which allows developers to inspect the webpage operations.

Security 

Web browsers are popular targets for hackers, who exploit security holes to steal information, destroy files, and other malicious activities. Browser vendors regularly patch these security holes, so users are strongly encouraged to keep their browser software updated. Other protection measures are antivirus software and avoiding known-malicious websites.

Breaches of web browser security are usually for the purpose of bypassing protections to display pop-up advertising collecting personally identifiable information (PII) for either Internet marketing or identity theft, website tracking or web analytics about a user against their will using tools such as web bugs, Clickjacking, Likejacking (where Facebook's like button is targeted), HTTP cookies, zombie cookies or Flash cookies (Local Shared Objects or LSOs); installing adware, viruses, spyware such as Trojan horses (to gain access to users' personal computers via cracking) or other malware including online banking theft using man-in-the-browser attacks.

See also

 Comparison of web browsers
 History of the World Wide Web
 List of web browsers

References

External links

 
English inventions